The Kalaallit Nunaat high arctic tundra ecoregion (WWF ID: NA1112) covers the coastal areas of northern and eastern Greenland (called Kalaallit Nunaat in the Greenlandic language).  Areas inland of this strip of land are either covered in ice or bare rock. About one-third of the region is covered by mosses and lichens, and another 3% by herbaceous vegetation and shrubs. The largest national park in the world, Northeast Greenland National Park, protects a majority of the land within the ecoregion.

Location and description 
The ecoregion covers the coastal fringe of Greenland, from 75° N latitude at Melville Bay, around the northern coast to 70° N at Scoresby Bay on the east coast.  The coastal bands south of this are in the Kalaallit Nunaat low arctic tundra ecoregion.  The coast is rugged, although less so than the south, with deep inlets from the sea.  The most ice-free of this coastal band is on the northeast, in the region of Peary Land.  The lower soil is permafrost.

Climate 
The climate of the ecoregion is Tundra climate (Köppen climate classification ET), a local climate in which at least one month has an average temperature high enough to melt snow (0 °C (32 °F)), but no month with an average temperature in excess of 10 °C (50 °F).  There is less precipitation than in the south.

Flora and fauna 
Plant life is sparse, with scattered fields of heath and fellfields of low herbaceous cushion plants.  There are no trees.  Vegetation is strongest on the east coast, with the greatest extents towards the south.  Plant adaptations required to live in this harsh environment include tolerating cold, long periods of darkness, and precipitation that mostly falls as snow.  50% of the territory is bare rock and ice, or very sparse vegetation.  30% of the ecoregion has a cover of moss and lichen, and another 3% of herbaceous cover and shrubs.  Some small areas on the east coast have greater plant life around hot springs, particularly marsh willowherb (Epilobium palustre)) and the northern green orchid (Platanthera hyperborea).

Studies have identified eight types of vegetation on the east coast from 72 to 79° N:
 Dwarf shrub heaths (Cassiope tetragona, Salix arctica, Vaccinium uliginosum or Betula nana,
 Grasslands (dry in summer: Arctagrostis latifolia, Carex bigelowii, sooty sedge (Carex misandra), and Eriophorum triste)
 Permanently wet fens (Carex stans, Eriophorum scheuchzeri, and Arctagrostis latifolia)
 Snowbeds (Phippsia algida, Salix herbacea, Trisetum spicatum and Erigeron humilis);
 Open, graminoid Dryas-heaths and fellfields on dry soil (Carex nardina, Carex rupestris, and Kobresia myosuroides); 
 Fellfields (Calamagrostis purpurascens and Carex supina)
 Communities on wet ground that is covered by an organic crust (Koenigia islandica and Festuca hyperborea); 
 Halophytic vegetation (Puccinellia phryganodes and Carex subspathacea).

Protected areas 
Over 71% of the ecoregion is officially protected.  Portions of the ecoregion lie in:
 Northeast Greenland National Park.  The largest national park in the world.
 Kilen Ramsar site.  The northernmost Ramsar wetland in the world.

References

External links

Nearctic ecoregions
Ecoregions of Denmark
Tundra ecoregions